Peter Innes is the name of:

Peter Innes (footballer), Scottish footballer in 2012–13 Forfar Athletic F.C. season
Sir Peter Innes of the Innes baronets, of Balvenie
Captain Peter Innes who was awarded Lot 50, Prince Edward Island